Keelin is a given name. Notable people with the given name include:

Keelin Fox, Irish badminton player
Keelin Godsey (born 1984), American transgender hammer thrower
Keelin Shanley (born 1968), Irish journalist, newsreader and presenter
Keelin Winters (born 1988), American soccer player